Espe is a manor house and estate in Denmark. It is located at Boeslunde, between Korsør and Skælskør, Slagelse Municipality, some 100 kilometres southwest of Copenhagen. Espe has been listed on the Danish registry of protected buildings and places since 1918. The main building dates to the 18th century but was adapted to the Late Neoclassical style in 1848. The manor and estate has been owned by members of the Moltke family since 1810.

History
The earliest history of the estate is unclear but it is known that the Crown ceded it to Johan Friis in exchange for other property in  1561. It is believed that it over the next period of time shared its ownership with Borreby. In 1667, Dorthe Daa sold it to the mayor of Skælskør, Anders Mogensen. It is assumed that it was later acquired by Anders Hansen, whose widow, Anne Marie Andersdatter, was the owner in 1689. In 1703, she ceded it to her son-in-law, Gerlach Thigillius, who in 1719 returned it to his mother-in-law.

Im 1723, Anne Marie Andersdatter sold Espe to Mette Rosenkrantz. Mette Rosenkrantz died in 1730. Her heirs than sold the estate to Christian Frederik de Boysset, who just a few years later, in 1736, sold it to Poul Schnabel. In 1747, Espe changed hands again when it was sold to Friederich Lorentz von Bülow. He had also acquired the estate Bonderup. After Friederich Lorentz von Bülow's death, Espe and Bonderup were sold to Johan Ludvig Schwerman, who in 1758 sold them to Peder Christensen. In 1760, he sold Espe to Folmer Danchel. Folmer Danchel died in 1773. The new owner, Hans Thibi, committed suicide later that same year.

In 1775, Espe was acquired by Morten Quistgaard. He was a member of the important 1786 Agriculture Commission where he opposed the abolition of stavnsbåndet. In 1In 1788, he ceded Espe to his son, Johan Rehling Quistgaard, who sold the estate in 1798. Over the next decade it changed hands three times more.

In 1810, Espe was acquired by Otto Joachim Moltke. In 1825, he also purchased Bonderup. Moltke sold most of the tenant farms to the copyholders and constructed a new main building. He died in 1858. Espe and Bonderup then went to his son, Adam Gottlob Moltke, who was succeeded by his son Joachim Vilhelm Moltke in 1863. He died just five years later and his widow then managed the estate on behalf of their newborn son, Adam Gottlob Moltke. He ended up owning Espe for 90 years but for long periods of time lived elsewhere. After his death in 1958, Espe went to Adam Moltke-Huitfeldt.

Today
The current owner is Elise Josephine Moltke-Huitfeldt.

Cultural references
Espe was used as a location in the 1954 drama film Landmandsliv.

List of owners
 ( -1561) Kronen 
 (1561-1570) Johan Friis 
 (1570-1616) Christian Friis 
 (1616-1617) Mette Hardenberg, gift Friis 
 (1617-1618) Dorthe Friis, gift Daa 
 (1618-1641) Claus Daa 
 (1641-1652) Jørgen Daa 
 (1641- ) Dorthe Clausdatter Daa, gift Krabbe 
 ( - ) Gregers Krabbe 
 ( -1667) Dorthe Clausdatter Daa, gift Krabbe 
 (1667-1682) Anders Mortensen 
 (1682- ) Anderse Hansen 
 ( -1703) Anne Marie Andersdatter, gift Hansen 
 (1703-1719) Gerlach Thigullius 
 (1719-1723) Anne Marie Andersdatter, gift Hansen 
 (1723-1730) Mette Rosenkrantz, gift Ramel 
 (1730) Boet efter Mette Rosenkrantz, gift Ramel 
 (1730-1736) Christian Frederik de Boysset 
 (1736-1747) Poul Schnabel 
 (1747-1748) Frederik Lorentz von Bülow 
 (1748-1750) Boet efter Frederik Lorentz von Bülow 
 (1750-1758) Johan Ludvig Schwermann 
 (1758-1760) Peder Christensen 
 (1760-1773) Folmer Danchel 
 (1773) Hans G. Thibi 
 (1773-1775) Boet efter Hans G. Thibi 
 (1775-1788) Morten Iversen Qvistgaard 
 (1788-1798) Johan Rehling Qvistgaard 
 (1798-1804) Cosmus Bornemann 
 (1804-1805) Simon Groth Clausen 
 (1805- ) Hans Frederik Uldall 
 ( -1810) Frederik Christian Hansen 
 (1810-1853) Otto Joachim Moltke 
 (1853-1863) Adam Gottlob Moltke 
 (1863-1868) Otto Joachim Vilhelm Moltke 
 (1868-1958) Adam Gottlob Moltke 
 (1958-1977) Adam Nicolas Moltke-Huitfeldt 
 ( -2013) Adam Carl Moltke-Huitfeldt 
 (2013- ) Elise Josephine Moltke-Huitfeldt

References

External links
 Official website
 Source

Manor houses in Slagelse Municipality
Listed buildings and structures in Slagelse Municipality
Listed castles and manor houses in Denmark
Neoclassical architecture in Denmark
Houses completed in 1848
Buildings and structures associated with the Friis family
Buildings and structures associated with the Daa family
Buildings and structures associated with the Krabbe family
Buildings and structures in Denmark associated with the Moltke family
Buildings and structures associated with the Huitfeldt family